Charles P. Lowery (born November 12, 1949) is an American former basketball player who played guard in the National Basketball Association. Lowery was originally drafted in the eighth round of the 1971 NBA Draft by the Seattle SuperSonics. He would play that season with the Milwaukee Bucks.

References

1949 births
Living people
American men's basketball players
Milwaukee Bucks players
Point guards
Puget Sound Loggers men's basketball players
Seattle SuperSonics draft picks